The 1982–83 Bundesliga was the 20th season of the Bundesliga, West Germany's premier football league. It began on 17 August 1982 and ended on 4 June 1983. Hamburger SV were the defending champions.

Competition modus
Every team played two games against each other team, one at home and one away. Teams received two points for a win and one point for a draw. If two or more teams were tied on points, places were determined by goal difference and, if still tied, by goals scored. The team with the most points were crowned champions while the two teams with the fewest points were relegated to 2. Bundesliga. The third-to-last team had to compete in a two-legged relegation/promotion play-off against the third-placed team from 2. Bundesliga.

Team changes to 1981–82
SV Darmstadt 98 and MSV Duisburg were directly relegated to the 2. Bundesliga after finishing in the last two places. They were replaced by FC Schalke 04 and Hertha BSC. Relegation/promotion play-off participant Bayer 04 Leverkusen won on aggregate against Kickers Offenbach and thus retained their Bundesliga status.

Season overview

Team overview

League table

Results

Relegation play-offs
FC Schalke 04 and third-placed 2. Bundesliga team Bayer 05 Uerdingen had to compete in a two-legged relegation/promotion play-off. Uerdingen won 4–2 on aggregate and thus were promoted to the Bundesliga.

Top goalscorers

Champion squad

See also
 1982–83 2. Bundesliga
 1982–83 DFB-Pokal

References

External links
 DFB Bundesliga archive 1982/1983

Bundesliga seasons
1
Germany